The 1994 Big South Conference men's basketball tournament took place March 4–7, 1994, at the North Charleston Coliseum in North Charleston, South Carolina. For the first time in their school history, the Liberty Flames won the tournament, led by head coach Jeff Meyer.

Format
All of the conference's nine teams were originally set to participate in the tournament, hosted at the North Charleston Coliseum. However, due to recruiting violations committed by Coastal Carolina the previous season, the Chanticleers were declared ineligible and all other members were allowed to participate. Teams were seeded by conference winning percentage. This was the last year for Campbell as a member of the conference, although they returned to the league in 2011–12.

Bracket

* Asterisk indicates overtime game
Source

All-Tournament Team
Peter Aluma, Liberty
Darryl Williams, Liberty
Scott Neely, Campbell
Joe Spinks, Campbell
Tyrone Travis, Radford

References

Tournament
Big South Conference men's basketball tournament
Big South Conference men's basketball tournament
Big South Conference men's basketball tournament